Dary Myricks (born September 27, 1976 in Jackson, Georgia) is a former Arena Football League offensive lineman/defensive lineman. He played for the Carolina Cobras, the Detroit Fury, and the Georgia Force. Myricks became the head football coach for his alma mater, Jackson High, in 2013.

High school years
Myricks attended Jackson High School in Jackson, Georgia and lettered four times in football and three times in basketball. In football, he was a McDonald's All-America honoree and played in the North-South All-Star Game.

College years
Myricks attended The Citadel, and was a four-year letterman. He finished his career with 178 tackles and six sacks, and as a senior, he won first team All-Southern Conference honors.

After completing a successful career in the Arena Football League, Mr. Myricks now works as a high school graduation specialist at Jackson High School, where he coaches football and is the head basketball coach.

References

External links
 Stats from arenafan.com

1976 births
Living people
American men's basketball players
American football defensive linemen
American football offensive linemen
Carolina Cobras players
Detroit Fury players
Georgia Force players
The Citadel Bulldogs football players
McDonald's High School All-Americans
High school football coaches in Georgia (U.S. state)
High school basketball coaches in Georgia (U.S. state)
People from Jackson, Georgia
Players of American football from Georgia (U.S. state)
African-American coaches of American football
African-American players of American football
African-American basketball coaches
African-American basketball players
Sportspeople from the Atlanta metropolitan area